Palaeoloxodon is an extinct genus of elephant. The genus originated in Africa during the Pliocene era, and expanded into Eurasia during the Pleistocene era. The genus contains some of the largest known species of elephants, over four metres tall at the shoulders, including the European straight-tusked elephant (Palaeoloxodon antiquus), and the southern Asian Palaeoloxodon namadicus, the latter of which was possibly the largest known land mammal based on fragmentary remains, but this requires proper reexamination. In contrast, the genus also contains many species of dwarf elephants that evolved via insular dwarfism on islands in the Mediterranean, some only a metre in height, making them the smallest elephants known. The genus has a long and complex taxonomic history, and at various times, it has been considered to belong to Loxodonta or Elephas, but today is usually considered a valid and separate genus in its own right.

Taxonomy
In 1924,  circumscribed Palaeoloxodon as a subgenus of Loxodonta. It included the "E. antiquus—namadicus group", and he designated "E. namadicus naumanni Mak." as its type species.

Palaeoloxodon was later thought to be a subgenus of Elephas, but this was abandoned by 2007. In 2016, a mitochondrial DNA sequence analysis of P. antiquus found that it was nested within the genus Loxodonta, more closely related African forest elephant, Loxodonta cyclotis, than the African bush elephant, Loxodonta africana. The authors suggested that this invalidated the genus Palaeoloxodon as currently recognized. A second study published in 2018 based on the nuclear genome suggested P. antiquus had a complex hybridization history, with over 60% of its DNA coming from a lineage closest to but outside the two extant Loxodonta species, around 6% from Mammuthus and 30% from a lineage closer to L. cyclotis than L. africana. The hybridisation probably took place in Africa, where Palaeoloxodon was dominant for most of the Pliocene and Early Pleistocene.

Mainland species 
 P. recki (Synonym:Elephas recki) (East Africa), the oldest (4.0 - 0.6 million years ago) and one of the largest species
P. antiquus (Synonym:Elephas antiquus) (Straight tusked elephant) (Europe, Middle East, western Asia)
 P. huaihoensis (China)
 P. namadicus (Synonym:Elephas namadicus) (Indian subcontinent, possibly also elsewhere in Asia), the largest in its genus, and possibly the largest terrestrial mammal ever
 P. naumanni (Synonym:E. namadicus naumanni) (Japan, possibly also China and Korea),
 ?P. turkmenicus known from a single specimen found in the Middle Pleistocene of Turkmenistan, with possibly attributable remains known from Kashmir, validity uncertain.

Mediterranean island dwarfs 
These Mediterranean insular dwarf elephant species are almost certainly descended from P. antiquus

 P. creutzburgi (Crete)
P. xylophagou (Cyprus) 
 P. cypriotes (Cyprus) 
 P. lomolinoi (Naxos) 
 P. tiliensis (Tilos) 
 P. mnaidriensis (Sicily and Malta)
P. falconeri (Sicily and Malta)

Description 

Most species of Palaeoloxodon (aside from P. turkmenicus) are noted for their distinctive parieto-occipital crests present at the top of the cranium, which was used to anchor the splenius as well as possibly the rhomboid muscles to support the skull, which is proportionally large in comparison to other elephants. The development of the crest is variable depending the species, growth stage and gender, with females and juvenliles having less developed or absent crests. The tusks have relatively little curvature, and are proportionally large.

Evolution 

Palaeoloxodon first appears in the fossil record in Africa during the early Pliocene, around 4 Mya as the species Palaeoloxodon recki. P. recki was the dominant elephant in Africa for the Pliocene and most of the Pleistocene. A population of P. recki migrated out of Africa between 0.8 and 0.6 Mya, diversifying into the radiation of Eurasian Palaeoloxodon species, including P. antiquus, P. namadicus, and P. naumanni, the precise relationships of the Eurasian taxa to each other are obscure in the absence of molecular evidence. P. recki became extinct in Africa around 0.5 Mya, being replaced by the modern genus Loxodonta. A species descended from P. recki, "Elephas" jolensis persisted in Africa until the late Middle Pleistocene, around 130,000 years ago. The arrival of P. antiquus in Europe co-incides with the extinction of Mammuthus meridionalis and its replacement by Mammuthus trogontherii, suggesting that it might have shared a similar dietary niche and outcompeted the former. P. antiquus was able to disperse onto many islands in the Mediterranean, undergoing insular dwarfism and speciating into numerous distinct varieties of dwarf elephants. Palaeoloxodon fossils are abundant in China and are assigned to three species, P. namadicus, P. naumanni and P. huaihoensis. However, the relationships of Chinese Palaeoloxodon are currently unresolved and it is unclear how many species were present in the region.

Extinction

Most Eurasian species of Palaeoloxodon became extinct towards the end of the last glacial period. The youngest record of P. antiquus are footprints from the southern Iberian Peninsula, dating to approximately 28,000 years ago. The youngest Japanese records of P. naumanni date to around 24,000 years ago. Similar dates have been reported for Indian P. namadicus and Chinese Palaeoloxodon. Some of the Mediterranean dwarf species held on for longer, with the youngest dates for the Cyprus dwarf elephant around 12,000 years ago. P. tiliensis from the Greek island of Tilos was suggested to have survived as recently as 3,500 years Before Present based on preliminary radiocarbon dating done in the 1970s, which would make it the youngest surviving elephant in Europe, but this has not been thoroughly investigated.

In a 2012 paper, Li Ji and colleagues from the Institute of Geographic Sciences and Natural Resources Research, Beijing, argued that 3000 year old teeth from Northern China previously believed to belong to Asian elephants were actually those of Palaeoloxodon. They also argued that Chinese ritual bronze vessels depicting trunks with two "fingers" must be Palaeoloxodon (which are only known from bones; their trunk characteristics are unknown) because Asian elephants only have one. Fossil elephant experts Victoria Herridge and Adrian Lister disagree with the assignment, stating that the claimed diagnostic dental features are actually contrast artifacts created due to the low image resolution of the figures in the scientific paper, which are not evident in better-quality photographs, and that the Bronze age vessels could be the result of stylistic choice.

References

 
Prehistoric elephants
Pliocene proboscideans
Pleistocene proboscideans
Prehistoric placental genera